The Switzerland men's national pitch and putt team represents Switzerland in the pitch and putt international competitions. It is managed by the Schweizerischen Pitch and Putt Verband-Swiss Pitch and Putt Association (SPPA). Since 2016 Swiss Pitch and Putt Federation (SPPF)

It is member of the European Pitch and Putt Association, and one of the founders of the Federation of International Pitch and Putt Associations (FIPPA) in 2006. Switzerland reached the 7th place in the Pitch and Putt World Cup in 2004 and the 7th place in the 2010 European Championship.

National team

Player for the Nationalteam 2019

Active players for the Swiss Pitch and Putt Nationalteam.
  

Active players for the Swiss Pitch and Putt Nationalteam 2018.

Players at international Tournaments

National team in the European Strokeplay Championship 2019
Felix Eberle
Janik Gattlen
Edy Planzer
Markus Planzer
Peter Bieri
Peter Hasler
Dieter Heutschi

National team in the European Championship 2018
Janik Gattlen 
Edy Planzer 
Mauro Zanini 
Claudio Naiaretti 
Carlo Doneda
Silvano Umberg

National team in the World Strokeplay Championship 2017
Benedict Muff
David Muff
Florian Muff
Claudio Naiaretti
Janik Gattlen
Markus Planzer
Felix Eberle
Mauro Zanini

National team in the World Cup 2016
 Edy Planzer
 Claudio Naiaretti
 Felix Eberle

National team in the European Strokeplay Championship 2015
Felix Eberle
Janik Gattlen
Ueli Lamm
Claudio Naiaretti
Edy Planzer

National team in the European Championship 2014
Felix Eberle
Jürg Fux
Silvano Umberg
Helmut Roth
Edy Planzer
Erich Herger

National team in the World Cup 2012
 Ueli Lamm
 Silvano Umberg
 Helmut Roth

National team in the European Championship 2010
Claudio Spescha
Ueli Lamm
Silvano Umberg
Helmut Roth
Edy Planzer
Hansheiri Legler

National team in the World Cup 2008
 Claudio Specha
 Marco Bernardini
 Oliver Schumacher

National team in the European Championship 2007
Bruno Zappa
Ueli Lamm
Giosuè Capone
Marco Bernardini
Bebbi Frisella
Claudio Spescha

Swiss Champions
Winner 2021

 Janik Gattlen Florian Muff Edi Planzer 

Netto 1. Kategorie 2021

 Edi Planzer Janik Gattlen Felix Eberle

Winner 2020

 Florian Muff Dieter Heutschi David Muff

Winner 2019

 Benedict Muff Florian Muff Michel Siegenthaler, Markus Planzer, David Muff

Winner 2018

 Florian Muff Markus Planzer Michel Siegenthaler

Winner 2017

 Florian Muff Edi Planzer Timo Minder

Winner 2016

 Erich Herger Markus Planzer Janik Gattlen

Winner 2015

 Ueli Lamm Daniel Wunderlin Erich Herger

Winner 2014

 Silvano Umberg Roberto Trivelal Romano Gurini

Captains
Current and former Swiss Pitch and Putt Federation Captains at international tournaments.

Swiss Pitch&Putt Course
Swiss Pitch and Putt places where Member of the SPPF (Swiss Pitch and Putt Federation).

See also
World Cup Team Championship
European Team Championship

External links
SPPF Swiss Pitch and Putt Federation
FIPPA Federation of International Pitch and Putt Associations website
EPPA European Pitch and Putt Association website

National pitch and putt teams
Pitch and putt